Lazurne may refer to the following places in Ukraine:

Lazurne (urban-type settlement), urban-type settlement in Skadovsk Raion, Kherson Oblast
Lazurne, Crimea, village in Alushta Municipality
Lazurne, Zaporizhia Oblast, village in Melitopol Raion